Mohammad Mohammadkazem (born September 28, 1985 in Tehran) is a volleyball player from Iran, who former plays as an Opposite-hitter for the Men's National Team of the year 2005–2011.

Honours

National team
Asian Championship
Silver medal (1): 2009
Asian Games
Silver medal (1): 2010
AVC Cup
Gold medal (2): 2008, 2010
Asian Junior Championship
Silver medal (1): 2004
World Youth Championship
Bronze medal (1): 2003
Asian Youth Championship
Silver medal (1): 2003

Club
Asian Championship
Gold medal (4): 2006, 2007, 2008, 2009, 2010 (Paykan)
Silver medal (1): 2005 (Saipa)
Iranian League
Champions (2): 2008, 2009, 2010 (Paykan)

Individual
Best Server:: 2006 Asian Club Championship
Best Scorer:: 2007 Asian Championship

References 

1985 births
Living people
Iranian men's volleyball players
Asian Games silver medalists for Iran
Volleyball players at the 2006 Asian Games
Asian Games medalists in volleyball
Volleyball players at the 2010 Asian Games
Medalists at the 2010 Asian Games